The 1960 UK & Ireland Greyhound Racing Year was the 34th year of greyhound racing in the United Kingdom and Ireland.

Roll of honour

Summary
The National Greyhound Racing Club released the 1960 figures for their affiliated tracks, which showed that 14,243,808 paying customers attended 5,736 meetings. The totalisator turnover was £54,188,302 but government tote tax remained at 10% with track deductions remaining at 6%. Turnover and attendances remained stable but one piece of government legislation was about to have a dramatic impact on the industry. The Betting and Gaming Act 1960 was passed on 1 September 1960 and would come into effect four months later, on 1 January 1961.

Tracks
Staines Greyhound Stadium closed, forcing Jack Walsh to open a bookmakers shop in Egham, Surrey, Walsh had been part owner with William Hill of the 1938 English Greyhound Derby winner Lone Keel. 

Gerry Bailey and Jack Carter took over the lease at Rye House Stadium from the Lea Valley Regional Park Authority and immediately began to upgrade the facilities moving the greyhound track to the outside of the speedway track to form a 440-yard circumference. Racing was held on Wednesday and Saturday evenings and an 'Inside Sumner' system and photo finish was installed.

Competitions
Mile Bush Pride reappeared after a remarkable 1959 and won the Wembley Spring Cup at his home track Wembley. His sire The Grand Champion was the leading sire in 1960. Scurry Gold Cup champion Gorey Airways ran a creditable second place behind Catch Cold in the Gold Collar at Catford Stadium. 

Sprint champion Gorey Airways then became the first greyhound to successfully defend the Scurry Gold Cup, the Jimmy Jowett trained brindle ran out as easy five and a quarter length winner. The following month the Laurels at Wimbledon Stadium, attracted the usual strong entry and the £1,000 prize went to Dunstown Paddy with Gorey Airways finishing third and Clonalvy Pride fifth. The Derby champion Duleek Dandy broke a hock and could not contest any further races in 1960.

The Cesarewitch at West Ham Stadium was won by the Rostown Genius adding to his Scottish Greyhound Derby crown; Clonalvy Pride did win the Pall Mall Stakes and Select Stakes but finished his year underachieving after finishing fourth in the Cesarewitch final. He had been favourite for three classics and second favourite for the Derby and failed in all four attempts.

News
A kennel block at Rochester Stadium suffered a terrible fire which resulted in the death of 24 greyhounds trained by Reg Morley. Morley and his head lad Mr Morton attempted to rescue them and both suffered injuries, Morley was brought out unconscious. Ken Appleton died and his West Ham Stadium kennels were taken over by his son Kenric Appleton.

Ireland
The Bord na gCon installed a new totalisator system at four tracks Harolds Cross, Shelbourne Park, Cork and Limerick, in addition to obtaining Clonmel from the Morris family headed by T.A.Morris the former secretary of the Irish Coursing Club.

Dunmore Stadium in Belfast had sixty bookmakers operating on course, an unusually high amount but tote betting was still illegal in Northern Ireland despite the sport being more popular than in Southern Ireland. 

During the 1960 Irish Greyhound Derby second round action, a puppy called Palms Printer ran on the supporting card and won a graded race in a very fast time. The pup was sold at the Shelbourne Park sales in November and was eventually bought by Paddy McEvoy for £400. The Irish Derby winner Perrys Apple and two finalists Eccentric Sam and Kilmoney Tulip all found themselves at the Shelbourne sales and surprisingly all three failed to meet their reserves, the champion Perrys Apple only attracted a 750 guineas. 

The Irish Derby final was to be a final swansong for the great champion Pigalle Wonder, now aged four and a half years old, he was then retired. He would later become a prominent sire.

Principal UK races

	

+Track Record

Totalisator returns

The totalisator returns declared to the licensing authorities for the year 1960 are listed below. Not all track with tote facilities during 1960 are listed and tracks that did not have a totalisator in operation are not listed.

References 

Greyhound racing in the United Kingdom
Greyhound racing in the Republic of Ireland
UK and Ireland Greyhound Racing Year
UK and Ireland Greyhound Racing Year
UK and Ireland Greyhound Racing Year
UK and Ireland Greyhound Racing Year